, born  (born June 25, 1948 ) is an actor from Japan. Makoto is famous for playing the role of Tsuyoshi Kaijō / AkaRanger in Himitsu Sentai Goranger.

Biography 
Naoya Makoto debuted as an actor in 1971. His first appearance was as a guest performer in the film Gendai Yakuza: Sakura Chi Sankyoudai.  Over the next few years, Makoto performed in a variety of small roles. He also plays small roles in musical theater. In 1975, he starred in Himitsu Sentai Goranger and became famous.

Makoto also has a singing career in J-pop (Japanese pop music). His world solo recording career began with the EP 'Omae no Asakusa', which was released in 1978 on the King Records label.

Filmography

Drama 
 Fireman (NTV, 1973) - Daisuke Misaki / Fireman
 Shounen Drama Series / Ken kaere jii (NHK, 1973)
 Eyeful Daisakusen (episode 37) (TBS, 1973)
 Ronin of the Wilderness (episode 1, serial 2) (NET, 1974) - Saku Ware
 Ōedo Sōsamō (episode 127) (Tokyo 12 Channel, 1974)
 Himitsu Sentai Goranger (NET, 1975–1977) - Tsuyoshi Kaijō / AkaRanger
 Tokusō Saizensen (Special Investigation Front Line) (TV Asahi, 1977–1985) - Sersan Polisi Ryuji Yoshino
 Taketonbo (NTV, 1980)
 NHK Taiga drama / Shishi no Jidai (NHK, 1980) - Josuke Urakawa
 Ginga TV Shousetsu / Kemuri ga Me ni jimiru (NHK, 1981)
 Onna Kiri Insaikura (Fuji TV, 1982)
 The Suspense / Sanji: Bus Guide no Satsui (TBS, 1982)
 Deai, Meguriai (TBS, 1983)
 Yoshida Shigeru (Kansai TV, 1983)
 Hanasake Hanako 2 (NTV, 1983–1984)
 NHK Taiga drama / Haru no Hatou (NHK, 1985)
 Paula TV Shousetsu / Koi to Omelette (TBS, 1986)
 Tokusō Saizensen / (TV Asahi, 1987) - Matsu Teppou
 Edo wo Kiru VII (episode 22) (TBS, 1987) - Kichinosuke Oda
 Chushingura: Onna-tachi no Ai (TBS, 1987)
 Tenka no Goiken Ban Makaritooru! Hikozaemon Gaiki (TV Asahi, 1987)
 Saturday Wide Gekijou Kyotaro Nishimura Travel Mystery 11 (TV Asahi, 1987)
 Osato (Yomiuri TV, 1987–1988)
 Hana no Shougai: Ii Tairou to Sakuradamon (TV Tokyo, 1988)
 Drama 23 / Kamakura wo Tabi suru Onna-tachi (TBS, 1988)
 Onihei Hankachō (episode 3, serial 1) (Fuji TV, 1989)
 Hana Shinjuu (Yomiuri TV, 1990)
 Hissatsu Special: Haru, Seizoroi Shigoto Nin! Harusameja, Akunin Taiji (ABC, 1990) - Seikichi
 Minamoto no Yoshitsune (NTV, 1991)
 Daihyou Torishimariyaku Deka (episode 29) (TV Asahi, 1991)
 Gakkou ga abunai (TBS, 1992)
 Kenkaya Ukon (episode 12, serial 2) (TV Tokyo, 1993) - Shindo
 Onihei Hankachō (episode 13, serial 5) (Fuji TV, 1994) - Usui no Kamataro
 Drama 30 / Michinoku Onsen Touhikou (CBC, 1994)
 Ai to Yabou no Dokugan Ryuu: Date Masamune (TBS, 1995)
 Mou Hitotsu no Kazoku (NHK, 1995)
 NHK Taiga drama / Hachidai Shougun Yoshimune (NHK, 1995) - Takenokoshi Masatake
 NHK Taiga drama / Hideyoshi (NHK, 1996) - Ishikawa Kazumasa
 Chushingura (Fuji TV, 1996)
 NHK Taiga drama / Genroku Ryouran (NHK, 1999) - Heihachiro Kobayashi
 Okan (Yomiuri TV, 2000)
 Rouge (NHK, 2001) - Iichiro Tanigawa
 O-Edo wo Kakeru! (episode 9) (TBS, 2001) - Shinhachi Amano
 NHK Taiga drama / MUSASHI (NHK, 2003) - Todo Takatora
 Serial Kagurazaka Sho Seikatsu Anzenka (TV Tokyo, 2005 - ongoing) - Principal Nakamura
 Taxi Driver's Mystery Diary 21 (TV Asahi, 2005) - Sawa
 Keishichou Sousa Ikka 9 Kakari (TV Asahi, 2006) - Masashi Koreeda
 Aibou Season V (TV Asahi, 2006)
 Homicide Team 9 Season 2 (TV Asahi, 2007) - Masashi Koreeda
 Homicide Team 9 Season 3 (TV Asahi, 2008) - Masashi Koreeda
 Kaizoku Sentai Gokaiger (TV Asahi, 2011) - AkaRanger (Guest)
 DCU (TBS, 2022) - Daigo Noda (episode 1)

Film 
 Gendai yakuza: Chi Sakura Sankyoudai (Toei, 1971) - Saburo
 Furyou Banchou: Totsugeki Ichiban (Toei, 1971)
 Mamushi no Kyoudai: Shougai Kyoukatsu Juuhachi-Pan (Toei, 1972)
 Hito Kiri Yota: Kyouken San-Kyoudai (Toei, 1972) - Hiroshi
 Furyou Banchou: Norainu Kidoutai (Toei, 1972) - Bakudan
 Furyou Banchou: Ichimoudajin (Toei, 1972) - Sabu
 Ookami Yakuza: Soui wa Ore ga Dasu (1972) - Jiro
 Bankaku Rock (1973) - Katsu
 Andougumi Gaiden: Hito Kiri Shatei (1974) - Nakada
 Yamaguchigumi Gaiden: Kyushu Shinkou Sakusen (1974) - Hitoshi Sakai
 Shougeki! Baishun Toshi (1974) - Jiro
 Battles Without Honor and Humanity: Police Tactics (1974) - Mamoru Kaneda
 Bouryoku Machi (1974) - Takeshi
 Karajishi Keisatu (1974) - Takao Narimatsu
 Battles Without Honor and Humanity: Final Episode (1974) - Shigehisa Kanazawa
 Ninkyou Hana Ichirin (1974) - Kenta Takahara
 New Battles Without Honor and Humanity (1974) - Tadashi
 Shorinji Kempo (1975) - Hiroshi Tomoda
 Track Yarou: Goiken Muyou (1975) - Goro Iwamura
 Track Yarou: Tenka Gomen (1976) - Masakazu Izawa
 Himitsu Sentai Goranger: Hurricane Bomb (Toei, 1976) - Tsuyoshi Kaijou / AkaRanger
 Track Yarou: Otoko Ippiki Momojiro (1977) - Sakurajima
 Ougon no Inu (Shochiku, 1979) - Detektif Masuda
 Honoo no Gotoku (Toho, 1981) - Kotaro Iroha
 Onimasa (Toei, 1982) - Tetsuo Gondo
 Yamashita Shounen Monogatari (Toho-Towa, 1985) - Shiraishi Sensei
 Saigo no Bakuto (Toei, 1985) - Kiyoshi Kawafuji
 Kanashiki Hitman (1989) - Hidemasa Kishita
 Mishima: A Life in Four Chapters (1989) - Teacher of Kendo
 Bungakushou Satsujin JZiken: Ooinaru Josou (Toei Classics Film, 1989) - Detektif Tanimoto
 Watermoon (Toei, 1989) - Kenzo Hirokawa
 Gekidou no 1750-Nichi (1990) - Asari
 Uteba kagerou (1991) - Tatsuya Negishi
 Shishiou-tachi no Natsu (1991) - Zenkichi Sakakibara
 Bakusou Tracker Gundan (KSS, 1994) - Yuichiro Kimizuka
 Ningen no Tsubasa: Saigo no Catch Ball (Cinema Craft, 1996) - Tokuo Konishi
 Edisi Film Namba Kinyuu Den, Minami no Teiou PART VIII (KSS, 1996) - Kuroda
 Wakkanai Hatsu, Manabi Za (JTA Kinema Tokyo, 1999)
 Shura ga yuku 10: Hokuriku Dairi Kessen (Toei Video, 2000) - Shizuo Nakayama
 Oyabun wa Jesus-Sama (Groove Corporation, 2001) - Satoru Kabira
 Jitsuroku Hitman: Tsuma, Sono Ai (Toei, 2002) - Kakiuchi
 New Battles Without Honor and Humanity/Murder, or Another Battle/Conspiracy (Toei Video, 2003)
 Bakuryuu Sentai Abaranger DELUXE: Abare Summer adalah Pembekuan! (Toei, 2003) - Kenja Akgal
 Koudou Taichou Den: Ketdumei (KSS, 2003) - Kanji Suemori
 Jitsuroku Hitman: Hokkai no Tora, Boukyou (Toei, 2003) - Kosuke Tahata
 Cerita Shibuya (Toei, 2004) - Yamauchi
 Gokudou no Onna-tachi: Jouen (2005)
 Haru Urara (Kinema Star Film, 2005)
 Otokomae: Nihonichi no Gaka ni nattaru! (Sazanami, 2005) - Oogaki
 Fuunji: Chouja Banzuke ni Idon da Otoko (AMC, 2006)
 Yakusoku no Gogo ~OVER THE NIGHT~ (Sazanami, 2007)
 Osaka Fukei Sennyuu Sousakan (2007) - Segawa
 Gokaiger Goseiger Super Sentai 199 Hero Great Battle (Toei, 2011) - Tsuyoshi Kaijou / AkaRanger
 Saber + Zenkaiger: Super Hero Senki (2021) - Akarenger (voice)

Theater 
 Shiranui onna Bushi (Shinjuku Koma Theater, 1981)
 Waraisetsu Inaka Kozo / Ora wa Tenka no Oodorobou (Meijiza, 1987)
 Hissatsu Shigotonin Nakamura Mondo Sanjou! (Umeda Koma Theater, 1988)
 W no Higeki (1993)
 Tsuki Umaya Oen ~Koi wa Miren yo Kanbotan~ (Meijiza, 1995)
 Edo no Haru: Onna Ichidai Matoi (1997)
 Naniwa Ninjou: Omoroi-Machi (Shin Kabukiza, 1999)
 Yuujou ~Akizakura no Ballade~ (2000)
 Yozakura Onana -Jinsei Gekijou- (Shin Kabukiza / Meijiza, 2001)
 The Drift 3/5: Yume no Shibahama Hanjouki (Misonoza, 2005)
 Douki no Sakura (Kudan Kaikan, 2006)

Discography 
 EP
 Omae no Asakusa (おまえの浅草) (King Records, 1978)
 Yukimushi (雪虫) (Teichiku, 1980)
 Sapporo City Light '87 (札幌 City Light '87) (1987)...with Ritsuko Abe

References

External links 
Profile on Toei site 
Sanim Union profile 
Naoya Makoto profile

Actors from Saga Prefecture
Japanese male film actors
Japanese male pop singers
Japanese male stage actors
Japanese male television actors
Musicians from Saga Prefecture
1948 births
Living people
20th-century Japanese male actors
20th-century Japanese male singers
20th-century Japanese singers
21st-century Japanese male actors